Bombay Dreams is a Bollywood-themed musical, with  music by A. R. Rahman, lyrics by Don Black and the book by Meera Syal and Thomas Meehan, originally produced by Andrew Lloyd Webber. The London production opened in 2002 and ran for two years. The musical was later produced on Broadway in 2004.

Plot
The story centers around Akaash, a young man from the slums of Bombay who dreams of becoming the next big star in Bollywood. Fate steps in when a rich lawyer and his fiancée, an aspiring documentary filmmaker, arrive to prevent the demolition of Akaash's slum. Akaash quickly falls in love with the lawyer's fiancée, Priya, who happens to be the daughter of a famous Bollywood director. Complications arise as Akaash faces the reality of show business, fame, his love for Priya, and his obligations to his family, friends, and his Paradise slum.

The story also deals with the change of name from Bombay to Mumbai and the identity issues that this raises.

Musical numbers
London production

Act 1
 "Bombay Awakes" – Ensemble
 "Bombay Dreams" – Ensemble
 "Like An Eagle" – Akaash, Ensemble
 "Love's Never Easy" – Sweetie, Ensemble
 Revised version of the song "Ishq Bina" from Taal
 "Don't Release Me" – Madan, Ensemble
 "Happy Endings" – Priya, Madan
 Revised version of the song "Rangeela Re" from Rangeela
 "Ooh La La" – Anupam, Kitty, Rani
 Revised version of the song "Manna Madurai (Ooh La La La)" from Minsara Kanavu
 "Like An Eagle (Reprise)" – Akaash
 "Shakalaka Baby" – Akaash, Rani
 Revised version of the song "Shakalaka Baby" from Mudhalvan
 "Are You Sure You Want to Be Famous?" – Akaash, Rani, Ensemble
 Revised version of the song "Sona Nahi Na Sahi" from One 2 Ka 4
 "I Could Live Here" – Akaash
 "Only Love" – Priya

Act 2
 "Chaiyya Chaiyya" – Akaash, Rani, Ensemble 
 Revised version of the song "Chaiyya Chaiyya" from Dil Se..
 "How Many Stars" – Priya, Akaash
 "Salaam Bombay" – Akaash, Rani, Ensemble
 "Closer Than Ever" – Sweetie, Akaash, Priya
 Revised version of the song "Nahin Samne" from Taal
 "Ganesh" – Ensemble
 "The Journey Home" – Akaash
 "Wedding Qawwali" – Vikram, Ensemble
 "Bombay Sleeps" – Akaash, Priya, Ensemble

Broadway production

Act 1
 "Salaam Bombay" – Akaash, Sweetie and Ensemble
 "Bollywood" – Akaash and Ensemble
 "Love's Never Easy" – Sweetie, Priya and Ensemble
 "Lovely, Lovely, Ladies" – Rani and Ensemble
 "Bhangra" – Akaash, Rani and Ensemble
 "Shakalaka Baby" – Rani, Akaash and Ensemble
 "I Could Live Here" – Akaash
 "Is This Love?" – Priya
 "Famous" – Madan, Rani, Akaash and Ensemble
 "Love's Never Easy (Reprise)" – Priya and Sweetie

Act 2
 "Chaiyya Chaiyya" – Akaash, Rani and Ensemble
 "How Many Stars?" – Akaash and Priya
 "Salaam Bombay (Reprise)" – Rani and Ensemble
 "Hero" – Sweetie and Priya
 "Ganesh Procession" – Ensemble 
 "The Journey Home" – Akaash
 "Wedding Qawwali" – Ensemble

Productions
Bombay Dreams premiered in the West End at the Apollo Victoria Theatre on 19 June 2002 and closed in June 2004.  The original cast included Preeya Kalidas as Priya, Raza Jaffrey as Akaash, Ayesha Dharker as Rani, Dalip Tahil as Madan, and Ramon Tikaram as Vikram.

The musical opened on Broadway at The Broadway Theatre on 29 April 2004 and closed on 1 January 2005 after 284 performances. The director was Steven Pimlott, with choreography by Farah Khan and Anthony Van Laast, and scenic and costume design by Mark Thompson. The cast featured Manu Narayan as Akaash and Madhur Jaffrey as Shanti. The plot, format and characters of Bombay Dreams were revised several times. The book of the musical was rewritten and many songs were cut and other songs added to the show for the Broadway run.

A new production produced by Atlanta's Theater of the Stars and the Independent Presenters Association started touring North America in February 2006 at the Orange County Performing Arts Center in Costa Mesa, California.

Reception
As of June 2004, the show was watched by over 1.5million people in the United Kingdom. In the United States, the production sold 552,954 tickets and grossed $22,437,579 at the Broadway Theatre by January 2005.

The Original London Cast Album, composed by A. R. Rahman, received a Gold certification and sold 250,000 units in the United Kingdom. The album was also a top-selling record in India.

Nominations
Tony Award for Best Costume Design – Mark Thompson (nominee) 
Tony Award for Best Choreography – Anthony Van Laast (nominee), Farah Khan (nominee)
Tony Award for Best Orchestrations – Paul Bogaev (nominee) 
Drama Desk Award Outstanding Choreography (nominee)
Drama Desk Award Outstanding Orchestrations (nominee)
Drama Desk Award Outstanding Set Design of a Musical (nominee)
Drama Desk Award Outstanding Costume Design (nominee)

Film adaptation
On 14 May 2010, Marquee Pictures was supposed to produce a film adaptation of the musical with Deepa Mehta directing the film.

References

External links
Internet Broadway Database listing for Bombay Dreams

West End musicals
Broadway musicals
A. R. Rahman albums
2002 musicals
2002 soundtrack albums
Theatre soundtracks